Iyer the Great is a 1990 Indian Malayalam-language psychological thriller film directed by Bhadran and starring Mammootty, Geetha, Shobana, Sukumari and Devan. The film was a commercial success upon release. M. S. Mani won the National Film Award for Best Editing for his work in the film.

Plot 
Vaikundam Soorya Narayana Iyer, a business executive, leads a normal family life along with Veni, his wife and his mother. After falling from a tree while trying to capture an escaped pet parrot, Iyer undergoes acrophobia giving him the power of clairvoyance. A couple of days later, he foresees a train accident with precise train number, and time of incident. He warns the railway authorities. But failing to take his warning into account, an accident takes place killing more than a hundred passengers. A couple of days later, Iyer foresees an airplane accident and informs the authorities about a future bombing on a flight in Delhi. Aided by the information, the disaster is prevented, causing Iyer to hit the headlines. He gets an insight about steroids added to a particular brand of baby food by Gabrias Group. Iyer contacts Amala, a news reporter who does an exposé, destroying the business empire of Gabrias. Gabria vows vengeance on Iyer and plants a bomb in his car, killing Iyer's entire family. In retaliation Iyer kills Gabrias, but is shot and admitted to hospital. At hospital, he predicts the setting of the sun early at 3 pm on Thursday. But Amala realizes that Iyer had just predicted his own death. The police impose tight security; however a terrorist group successfully enters the hospital shooting Iyer down at sharp 3 pm.

Cast 
 Mammootty as Soorya Narayana Iyer
 Geetha as Vani
 Sukumari as Soorya's Mother
 Devan as Gabria
 Shobana as Amala
 Ratheesh as Police Officer Chellappan
 M.G. Soman as Dr. Jacob
 M. S. Thripunithura  as Moorthy
 K. P. Ummer as G.D. Nair
 Ragini (New) as Ammu
 Vijay Menon

Release 
The film was released on 31 August 1990.

Reception 
The film received positive reviews from the critics and audience. The film was commercial success. The film was a success in Tamil Nadu too.

References

External links 
 
 Iyer the Great at Oneindia.in

1990 films
1990s Malayalam-language films
1990s psychological thriller films
Films about psychiatry
Works by Malayattoor Ramakrishnan
Films scored by M. S. Viswanathan
Films whose editor won the Best Film Editing National Award
Films directed by Bhadran